Almus is a town and a district of Tokat Province in the Black Sea region of Turkey.

Almus may also refer to:
 Saint Almus, a 13th-century Cistercian abbot
 Almus of Orchomenus, son of Sisyphus Greek mythology
 Almus, a brand of generic prescription medication by Alliance Boots
 Álmos (c. 820 – c. 895), or Almus, the first head of the loose federation of the Hungarian tribes from c. 850

See also
 
 Almus Dam, a dam near the town of Almus